Nephromegaly is the process whereby a kidney or both kidneys become enlarged. Both autosomal dominant and autosomal recessive polycystic kidney disease can cause nephromegaly.

References

Kidney diseases